The flying fish is a marine fish family consisting of approximately 70 species.

Flying fish may also refer to:

Art, entertainment, and media
 Flying Fish Records, a record label for folk, blues, Dancefloor and country music
 Flying Fish (film), a 2011 Sri Lankan anthology film by Sanjeewa Pushpakumara 
 The Log of the Flying Fish: A Story of Aerial and Submarine Peril and Adventure, a marine adventure book by Harry Collingwood, illustrated by Gordon Browne

Enterprises
 Flying Fish Books, a book publisher located in Tumacacori, Arizona
 Flying Fish Brewing, a brewery located in Somerdale, New Jersey
 Flying Fish Cafe, an eatery at Walt Disney World Resort 
 Flying Fish Press, a publisher of limited edition artists' books established by Julie Chen (book artist)

Ships
 HMS Flying Fish, a name given to several British Navy ships
 USS Flying Fish, a name given to three different US Navy ships
Flying Fish (clipper), an American clipper ship engaged in the tea trade, constructed in 1851

Other uses
 Exocet, a French-built anti-ship guided missile, named after the French word for flying fish
 Volans ("Flying"), a constellation originally Piscis Volans ("flying fish")

See also